The Estadio Juan Josafat Pichardo is a multi-use stadium located in Toluca, State of Mexico. It is currently used mostly for American football matches  The stadium has a capacity of 5,000 people.

References

External links

Multi-purpose stadiums in Mexico
Juan Josafat Pichardo
Athletics (track and field) venues in Mexico
College American football venues in Mexico
Toluca